The Termination of the Present War (Definition) Act 1918 was an Act of the British Parliament passed in 1918.

This act made provision and offered guidance as regards how the British Government would determine that the First World War had come to an end. Discretion was granted to His Majesty in Council to issue orders, which would legally determine the matter.

Thus the war between the British Empire and the following states ended with respect to:

 Germany on 10 January 1920
 Austria on 16 July 1920
 Bulgaria on 9 August 1920
 Hungary on 26 July 1921
 Turkey on 6 August 1924

For all other purposes, the war was declared to have ended on 31 August 1921.

Text

Use of law
Many soldiers had enlisted on a "short service" basis as introduced by Kitchener. This meant they had signed up for three years or the "duration of the war", which ever was the longer.  This act had an impact as regards how the "duration of the war" was understood. Thus the Termination of the Present War (Definition) Act 1918 was quoted by the War Office in conjunction with the Army of India on 9 May 1919, following the start of the third Anglo-Afghan War. This document explained the armistice of November 1918 was merely a suspension of hostilities. This meant that the Territorials serving in India would be required to remain there until the war itself had ended. This led to enquiries from a number of units as regards whether the new war with Afghanistan would be a factor in continuing the war. This was a particular concern to the lorry drivers of the Royal Army Service Corps, 600 of whom promptly went on strike in Karachi, and refused to entrain for departure to the North West Frontier. Brigadier General William Anderson at first proposed to imprison the strikers and send them back to Great Britain.

See also

Case law

References

United Kingdom Acts of Parliament 1918